The stellate veins join to form the interlobular veins, which pass inward between the rays, receive branches from the plexuses around the convoluted tubules, and, having arrived at the bases of the renal pyramids, join with the venae rectae.

References

External links
  - "Urinary System: kidney, H&E, interlobular artery and vein"

Kidney anatomy